The 1974 Texas Tech Red Raiders football team represented Texas Tech University in the Southwest Conference (SWC) during the 1974 NCAA Division I football season. In their fifth and final season under head coach Jim Carlen, the Red Raiders compiled a 6–4–2 record (3–4 against conference opponents), finished in sixth place in the SWC, and outscored opponents by a combined total of 193 to 158. The team's statistical leaders included Tommy Duniven with 552 passing yards, Larry Isaac with 671 rushing yards, and Lawrence Williams with 477 receiving yards. The team played its home games at Clifford B. & Audrey Jones Stadium.

Schedule

References

Texas Tech
Texas Tech Red Raiders football seasons
Texas Tech Red Raiders football